Ratton School is a secondary school with academy status in Eastbourne, East Sussex, England.

All of the communities are named after theatres in London.

Notable former pupils

 Joe Townsend (born 1988), paratriathlete

References

External links
Ratton School official website

Secondary schools in East Sussex
Educational institutions established in 1965
Academies in East Sussex
1965 establishments in England